Morimura (written: 森村 lit. "forest village") is a Japanese surname. Notable people with the surname include:

, Japanese psychiatrist and founder of Hyogo College of Medicine
, Japanese footballer
Sachiko Morimura (born 1972), Japanese Olympic gymnast
, Japanese writer
, Japanese artist

Japanese-language surnames